Materba Kanatha Gamage Chamila Premanath Lakshitha (born 4 January 1979), or Chamila Gamage, is a former Sri Lankan cricketer, who played twi Tests and 7 One Day Internationals in the early 2000s. He is a right-handed batsman and a right-arm fast-medium bowler. He is a past student of Richmond College, Galle. He made his Twenty20 debut on 17 August 2004, for Sri Lanka Air Force Sports Club in the 2004 SLC Twenty20 Tournament.

International career
Gamage, who started his international career in July 2002 against Bangladesh, made an immediate impact in international cricket, taking a wicket with his first ever delivery in Test cricket.

He continued to play in three ensuing One Day Internationals for Sri Lanka, and when batting, has top-scored (in the same match) with 40. His last international appearance was an ODI against Australia in 2003.

See also
 List of bowlers who have taken a wicket with their first ball in a format of international cricket

References

External links
 

1979 births
Living people
Sri Lanka One Day International cricketers
Sri Lanka Test cricketers
Sri Lankan cricketers
Alumni of Richmond College, Galle
Uva cricketers
Sri Lanka Cricket Combined XI cricketers
Kandurata cricketers
Sri Lanka Air Force Sports Club cricketers